White Stockings or Chicago White Stockings may refer to:

 Chicago Cubs, known as "Chicago White Stockings" from their conception in 1870 until 1889
 Chicago White Sox, known as "White Stockings" from 1900 until 1903; an agreement prohibited the team from using "Chicago" in their name